The 2021 Poznań Open was a professional tennis tournament played on clay courts. It was the seventeenth edition of the tournament which was part of the 2021 ATP Challenger Tour. It took place at the Park Tenisowy Olimpia in Poznań, Poland from 26 July to 1 August 2021.

Singles main-draw entrants

Seeds

 1 Rankings are as of 19 July 2021.

Other entrants
The following players received wildcards into the singles main draw:
  Leo Borg
  Daniel Michalski
  Aleksander Orlikowski

The following player received entry into the singles main draw as a special exempt:
  Nicolás Kicker

The following players received entry into the singles main draw as alternates:
  Pedro Cachín
  Jonáš Forejtek

The following players received entry from the qualifying draw:
  João Domingues
  Elmar Ejupovic
  David Poljak
  Alexander Shevchenko

The following players received entry as lucky losers:
  Evan Furness
  Miljan Zekić

Champions

Singles

  Bernabé Zapata Miralles def.  Jiří Lehečka 6–3, 6–2.

Doubles

  Zdeněk Kolář /  Jiří Lehečka def.  Karol Drzewiecki /  Aleksandar Vukic 6–4, 3–6, [10–5].

References

2021 ATP Challenger Tour
2021
2021 in Polish tennis
July 2021 sports events in Poland
August 2021 sports events in Poland